The Ukrainian Orthodox Eparchy of Central Canada is a diocese of the Ukrainian Orthodox Church of Canada under the Church of Constantinople. It is currently led by Metropolitan Yurij (Kalistchuk) of Winnipeg and Canada and has jurisdiction over Ukrainian Orthodox churches in the central Canadian provinces of Manitoba and Saskatchewan.

History
The early history of the Eparchy largely parallels that of the UOCC, which was founded on the territory of the diocese in Saskatoon, Saskatchewan. Since the reorganization of the Ukrainian Greek Orthodox Church of Canada (what later became the UOCC) as a metropolia in 1951 the Central Eparchy has served as the diocese of the 'first hierarch' or primate of the UOCC. Auxiliary or assistant bishops to the Metropolitan of the UOCC are consecrated with the title "of Saskatoon" to honor the city's role in the founding of the Church.

Eparchy today
The Central Eparchy currently consists of 153 cathedrals, parishes, missions, and chapels scattered across the Canadian Prairies. The seat of the diocesan bishop (also the national head of the UOCC) is Holy Trinity Cathedral in Winnipeg, Manitoba.

References

External links
Ukrainian Orthodox Church of Canada (English/Ukrainian)

Dioceses established in the 20th century
Ukrainian
Eastern Orthodox organizations established in the 20th century
Ecumenical Patriarchate of Constantinople
Ukrainian Canadian religion
Ukrainian diaspora in Canada
Ukrainian Orthodox church bodies
Ukrainian Orthodox Church of Canada